The Pirates! in an Adventure with Whaling (also known as The Pirates! In an Adventure with Ahab and The Pirates! In an Adventure with Moby Dick) is the second book in The Pirates! series by Gideon Defoe, published in 2005 by The Orion Publishing Group.

After The Pirates! in an Adventure with Scientists, the pirates felt that their ship was in need of some repair. So they go to see Cutlass Liz, the beautiful yet ferocious pirate boat yard owner, where, after much showing off, the Pirate Captain buys the most expensive boat, The Lovely Emma. Not having much gold the Pirates are unable to pay for the boat, so they go on an adventure to find 6,000 dubloons.

They go to Las Vegas, and get mixed up with Ahab, who is hunting Moby-Dick, the pirate Captain goes mad, and the Prize ham plays a major part in the whole adventure.

References

2005 British novels
British comedy novels
Works based on Moby-Dick
The Pirates!
Orion Books books